Coronel FAP Alfredo Mendívil Duarte Airport  is an airport serving Ayacucho, Peru. It is managed by CORPAC S.A. (Corporación Peruana de Aeropuertos y Aviación Comercial S.A.), a government organization that oversees Peruvian airports. It is the main airport of the Ayacucho Region.

The runway sits on a mesa overlooking the Totorilla River, with high terrain in all quadrants.

The Ayacucho non-directional beacon (Ident: AYA) is located on the field.

Airlines and destinations

See also
Transport in Peru
List of airports in Peru

References

External links 
OurAirports - Ayacucho
SkyVector Aeronautical Charts
OpenStreetMap - Ayacucho

Airports in Peru
Buildings and structures in Ayacucho Region